James Edwin Bowman (born October 26, 1963) is a former American football defensive back who played five seasons with the New England Patriots of the National Football League. He was drafted by the Patriots in the second round of the 1985 NFL Draft. During his rookie year, 1985, in the Divisional Playoff game against the Oakland Raiders, Bowman recovered two fumbles on Special Teams, one which led to a Tony Eason touchdown pass 2 plays later.  The second fumble recovery occurred following a Sammy Seale fumble on a kickoff.  Mosi Tatupu knocked the ball loose, and it rolled into the end zone where Bowman recovered it for what proved to be the game winning score in a 27-20 Patriots victory.  Bowman played with the Patriots in Super Bowl XX, a 46-10 loss to the Chicago Bears.  He played college football at Central Michigan University and attended Cadillac High School in Cadillac, Michigan.

References

External links
Just Sports Stats
New England Patriots bio

Living people
1963 births
Players of American football from Michigan
American football defensive backs
Central Michigan Chippewas football players
New England Patriots players
People from Cadillac, Michigan